Owenga is a small settlement on Chatham Island, in New Zealand's Chatham Islands group. It is the second easternmost settlement in New Zealand, after Flower Pot Bay on Pitt Island. It is located in the southeast of the island, close to Cape Fournier.

The Wharf at Owenga was built in 2010 and is the home of many fishing boats. It is also one of the main places to catch a fishing boat that may take you to Pitt Island. Owenga is one of the few settlements on the Chathams and has a fish factory, but no other shops.

References

Populated places in the Chatham Islands
Chatham Island